Mường Pồn is a commune (xã) and village of the Điện Biên District of Điện Biên Province, northwestern Vietnam. Less than 4 kilometres from the Lao border, it lies along National Route 12, north by road from Dien Bien Phu.

History
A small French force was located here before the Battle of Dien Bien Phu. After a two-day siege, it fell to the Viet Minh on 12 December 1953, despite an attempt to relieve the garrison by Pierre Langlais. The village was burned to the ground.

References

Communes of Điện Biên province
Populated places in Điện Biên province